Kevin "Kevvy Mental" Maher (born April 20, 1988) is a Canadian musician, producer, film composer and remix artist most notable for his work in Fake Shark as lead vocalist and programmer.

Early life
Maher was born an only child in Edmonton, Alberta, and raised in Langley, British Columbia, by a single mother. Maher attended Langley Fine Arts School majoring in visual art. Maher was kicked out of Langley Fine Arts in his grade 12 year. Maher attended Walnut Grove Secondary to finish his high school education. During his time at Walnut Grove, Maher also attended AI Burnaby for audio engineering.

Musical career

Maher is primarily a vocalist in the band Fake Shark, but also plays guitar, piano and programs electronics. He has done a variety of remixes, listed below. He has also programmed electronics and contributed vocals to Jakalope, as well as working alongside Dave Ogilvie coproducing the debut album by former Lillix bass player Louise Burns. The record was nominated for the Polaris Music Prize.

In 2008, Maher teamed up with writer/director CJ Wallis to score the Sarah Slean short film Last Flowers. The film received a pair of Leo Awards nominations in 2009.

In 2012, co-wrote and produced part of Carly Rae Jepsen's new record, Kiss, and wrote the Fake Shark - Real Zombie! record Liar. He has also composed some of the music for the film American Mary.

Influence

Maher cites a wide array of artists as influences. As a child, he listened to the Wu-Tang Clan. He has been quoted as listening to almost nothing but rap music and jazz. He is a huge fan of Tyler the Creator, Christian Scott, Nirvana, and Mike Patton. He is known to have a friendship with Matt Webb, guitarist of Canadian pop-rock band Marianas Trench.

Another influence and friend is Henry Rollins of Black Flag.

Credits
Fake Shark - Real Zombie! – Zebra! Zebra! Band Member (2007)
Fake Shark - Real Zombie! – Meeting People Is Terrible Band Member (2009)
Fan Death – A Coin for the Well (Audio Engineering) (2009)
Fan Death – Womb of Dreams (Audio Engineering) (2010)
Jakalope – Things That Go Jump in the Night – Vocals, Programming, Production (2010)
Louise Burns – Mellow Drama – Producer (2010)
The Birthday Massacre – Pins and Needles – Programming, Editing (2010)
Raggedy Angry – How I Learned To Love Our Robot Overlords – Vocals (2010)
Matt Webb of Marianas Trench (band) – EP Producer (2011)
Carly Rae Jepsen – Kiss – Writer / Producer (2012)
Jessica Lee – Carried Away – Producer (2012)
Fighting For Ithaca – To the Rescue Song Writer (2012)
Anami Vice – Are You Serious – Producer (2012)
Cat Thomson – TBA – Producer (2012)
We Need Surgery – Self Titled – Producer (2012)
The Birthday Massacre – Hide and Seek – Synthesizer / Drums (2012)
Kat Von D – TBA – Writer
Fighting For Ithaca – Do What We Wanna – Writer
Fake Shark - Real Zombie! – Liar – Writer/Producer
Paige Morgan – TBA – Producer
Down With Webster – TBA – Writer
Kate Morgan – TBA – Producer/Writer
Carly Rae Jepsen – Emotion Side B - Writer (2016)

References

External links
Kevin James Maher on Myspace

Canadian film score composers
Male film score composers
Canadian record producers
Living people
Musicians from Edmonton
Musicians from British Columbia
People from Langley, British Columbia (city)
Jakalope members
Die Mannequin members
1988 births